"Go n Get It" is a song by American rapper Ace Hood, released as the second single from his third studio album Blood, Sweat & Tears on June 14, 2011. The song was produced by Lex Luger, and co-written by Hood and Luger. Originally, "Go 'N Get It" was featured on Ace Hood's mixtape, Body Bag Vol. 1.

Music video
A music video to accompany the release of "Go n Get It" was first released onto YouTube on 5 July 2011 at a total length of four minutes and four seconds. This was his first music video made in his home town, Broward County.

Remixes
The official remix to "Go n Get It" features Beanie Sigel, Busta Rhymes, Pusha T and Styles P.

Tyga also did this song as "Bad Bitches", which features  fellow Young Money rapper Gudda Gudda, off of Tyga's "Black Thoughts 2" mixtape. Then, he remixed the song with 2 Chainz on his mixtape #BitchImTheShit.

Track listing

Charts

Release history

References

External links
 Official website 

2011 songs
Ace Hood songs
Song recordings produced by Lex Luger (musician)
Songs written by Ace Hood
Songs written by Lex Luger (musician)